Amber M. Baker is an American politician.  Baker is a Democrat and was elected as the representative for District 72 in the North Carolina House of Representatives, representing Forsyth County, in 2020.

Education and career
Baker holds a B.S. in elementary education from Howard University and an M.A. and Ph.D. in educational leadership and administration from Ohio State University. She served as the principal of Kimberley Park Elementary School in Winston-Salem, N.C., part of Winston-Salem Forsyth County Schools, from 2008 to 2019.

Electoral history

2020

References

Living people
Year of birth missing (living people)
Howard University alumni
Ohio State University alumni
Women state legislators in North Carolina
African-American state legislators in North Carolina
20th-century African-American people
20th-century African-American women
21st-century African-American women
21st-century American politicians
21st-century African-American politicians
21st-century American women politicians
Democratic Party members of the North Carolina House of Representatives